An overseas Filipino is a person of full or partial Filipino origin—i.e., people who trace back their ancestry to the Philippines but living or residing outside the country. This term generally applies to both people of Filipino ancestry and citizens abroad. As of 2019, there were over 12 million Filipinos overseas.

Population
Since the liberalization of the United States immigration laws in 1965, the number of people in the United States having Filipino ancestry has grown substantially. In 2007, there were an estimated 12 million Filipinos living overseas.

In 2013, the Commission on Filipinos Overseas (CFO) estimated that approximately 10.2 million people of Filipino descent lived or worked abroad. This number constitutes about 11 percent of the total population of the Philippines. It is one of the largest diaspora populations, spanning over 100 countries.

The Overseas Filipino Workers (OFWs) tend to be young and gender-balanced. Based on a survey conducted in 2011, the demographics indicate how the 24-29 age group constitutes 24 percent of the total and is followed by the 30-34 age group (23 percent) working abroad. Male OFWs account for 52 percent of the total OFW population. The slightly smaller percentage of the female overseas workers tend to be younger than their male counterparts. Production workers and service workers account for more than 80 percent of the labor outflows by 2010 and this number is steadily increasing, along with the trend for professional workers, who are mainly nurses and engineers. Filipino seamen, overseas Filipino workers in the maritime industry, make an oversize impact on the global economy, making up a fifth to a quarter of the merchant marine crews, who are responsible for the movement of the majority of goods in the global economy.

The OFW population is consistently increasing through the years and this is partly attributed to the government's encouragement of the outflow of contractual workers as evidenced in policy pronouncements, media campaigns, and other initiatives. For instance, it describes the OFWs as the heroes of the nation, encouraging citizens to take pride in these workers.

Economic impact
In 2012, the Bangko Sentral ng Pilipinas (BSP), the central bank of the Philippines, expected official remittances coursed through banks and agents to grow 5% over 2011 to US$21 billion, but official remittances are only a fraction of all remittances. 

Remittances by unofficial, including illegal, channels are estimated by the Asian Bankers Association to be 30 to 40% higher than the official BSP figure. 

In 2011, remittances were US$20.118 billion. 

In 2012, approximately 80% of the remittances came from only 7 countries—United States, Canada, the United Kingdom, UAE, Saudi Arabia, Singapore, and Japan.

In 2018, remittance had increased to $31 billion, which was nearly 10% of the GDP of the Philippines. 

In 2019, Overseas Filipinos sent back $32.2 billion to the Philippines.

Issues

Employment conditions

Employment conditions abroad are relevant to the individual worker and their families as well as for the sending country and its economic growth and well-being. Poor working conditions for Filipinos hired abroad include long hours, low wages and few chances to visit family. Evidence suggests that these women cope with the emotional stress of familial separation in one of two ways: first, in domestic care situations, they substitute their host-family's children for their own in the love and affection they give, and second, they actively considered the benefit their earnings would have on their children's future. Women often face disadvantages in their employment conditions as they tend to work in the elder/child care and domestic. These occupations are considered low skilled and require little education and training, thereby regularly facing poor working conditions. Women facing just working conditions are more likely to provide their children with adequate nutrition, better education and sufficient health. There is a strong correlation between women's rights and the overall well-being of children. It is therefore a central question to promote women's rights in order to promote children's capabilities.

According to a statement made in 2009 by John Leonard Monterona, the Middle East coordinator of Migrante, a Manila-based OFW organization, every year, an unknown number of Filipinos in Saudi Arabia were then "victims of sexual abuses, maltreatment, unpaid salaries, and other labor malpractices".

Government policy
Philippine Labor Migration Policy has historically focused on removing barriers for migrant workers to increase accessibility for employment abroad. Working conditions among Filipinos employed abroad varies depending on whether the host country acknowledges and enforces International labor standards. The standards are set by the ILO, which is an UN agency that 185 of the 193 UN members are part of. Labor standards vary greatly depending on host country regulations and enforcement. One of the main reasons for the large differences in labor standards is due to the fact that ILO only can register complaints and not impose sanctions on governments.

Emigration policies tend to differ within countries depending on if the occupation is mainly dominated by men or women. Occupations dominated by men tend to be driven by economic incentives whereas emigration policies aimed at women traditionally tend to be value driven, adhering to traditional family roles that favors men's wage work. As women are regularly seen as symbols of national pride and dignity, governments tend to have more protective policies in sectors dominated by women. These policies risk to increase gender inequality in the Philippines and thereby this public policy work against women joining the workforce. Female OFWs most often occupy domestic positions.  However, some researchers argue that the cultural trends of female migrancy have the potential to destabilize the gender inequality of the Filipino culture. Evidence suggests that in intact, heterosexual families wherein the wife-mother works overseas, Filipino fathers have the potential to take on greater roles in care-giving to their children, though seldom few actually do. Other researchers report that these situations lead to abuse, particularly of older daughters, who face increased pressure and responsibility in the mother's absence. Likewise, the “reversal of breadwinning and caregiving roles between migrant wives and left-behind husbands” more often results in tension regarding family finances and the role each spouse should play in decision making.

The Philippine government has recently opened up their public policy to promote women working abroad since the world's demand for domestic workers and healthcare workers has increased. This has led to the government reporting a recent increase in women emigrating from the Philippines. A healthcare problem arises as migrating women from the Philippines and other developing countries often create a nursing shortage in the home country. Nurse to patient ratio is down to 1 nurse to between 40 and 60 patients, in the 1990s the ratio was 1 nurse to between 15 and 20 patients. It seems inevitable that the healthcare sector loses experienced nurses as the emigration is increasing.
The Japan-Philippines Economic Partnership Agreement is seen as a failure by most since only 7% of applicants or 200 nurses a year has been accepted on average – mainly due to resistance by domestic stakeholders and failed program implementation. The result is a "lose-lose" outcome where Philippine workers fail to leverage their skills and a worldwide shortage persists. Despite the fact that Japan has an aging population and many Filipinos want to work in Japan, a solution has not yet been found. The Japanese Nursing Association supports "equal or better" working conditions and salaries for Filipino nurses. In contrast, Yagi propose more flexible wages to make Filipinos more attractive on the Japanese job market. 

Results from a focus group in the Philippines shows that the positive impacts from migration of nurses is attributed to the individual migrant and his/her family, while the negative impacts are attributed to the Filipino healthcare system and society in general. In order to fill the nursing shortage in the Philippines, suggestions have been made by several NGOs that nursing-specializing Filipino workers overseas, locally known as "overseas Filipino workers" (OFWs), return to the country to train local nurses, for which program training would be required in order for the Philippines to make up for all its nurses migrating abroad.

Host country policies

Wealthier households derive a larger share of their income from abroad. This might suggest that government policies in host countries favor capital-intensive activities. Even though work migration is mainly a low and middle class activity, the high-income households are able to derive a larger share of their income from abroad due to favorable investment policies. These favorable investment policies causes an increase in income inequalities and do not promote domestic investments that can lead to increased standard of living.
This inequality threatens to halt the economic development as investments are needed in the Philippines and not abroad in order to increase growth and well-being. A correlation between successful contribution to the home country's economy and amounted total savings upon the migrants return has been found, therefore it is important to decrease income inequalities while attracting capital from abroad to the Philippines.

Many host governments of OFWs have protective policies and barriers making it difficult to enter the job market. Japan has been known for rigorous testing of Filipinos in a way that make them look reluctant to hold up their part of the Japan-Philippines Economic Partnership Agreement and solely enjoy the benefit of affordable manufacturing in the Philippines, not accepting and educating OFWs.

Return migration

Returning migrant workers are often argued to have a positive effect on the home economy since they are assumed to gain skills and return with a new perspective.
Deskilling has caused many Filipino workers to return less skilled after being assigned simple tasks abroad, this behavior creates discouragement for foreign workers to climb the occupational ladder. Deskilling of labor is especially prevalent among women who often have few and low skill employment options, such as domestic work and child or elder care. Other occupations that recently has seen an increase in deskilling are doctors, teachers and assembly line workers.

To underline what a common problem this deskilling is: Returning migrant workers are calling for returnee integration programs, which suggests that they do not feel prepared to be re-integrated in the domestic workforce.

As the Philippines among other countries who train and export labor repeatedly has faced failures in protecting labor rights, the deskilling of labor has increased on a global scale. A strong worldwide demand for healthcare workers causes many Filipinos to emigrate without ever getting hired or become deskilling while possibly raising their salary. The result is a no-win situation for the sending and receiving country. The receiving countries lose as skilled workers are not fully utilizing their skills while the home country simultaneously experience a shortage of workers in emigrating prone sectors.

Countries and territories with Filipino populations

: In the 2016 Census, there were 232,386 Filipino Australians.
: , the Filipino community in Austria numbered roughly 30,000. See Filipinos in Austria.
: , there were 2,000 Filipinos in The Bahamas.
: , there were 55,790 Filipinos in Bahrain.
: , there were 12,224 Filipinos in Belgium.
: , there were about 29,578 Filipinos in the South American country.
: , there were more than 20,000 Filipinos living in Brunei.
: , there were 676,775 Filipinos in Canada. See Filipino Canadians.
: , there were 4,119 Filipinos in Cayman Islands.
: , there were 12,254 Filipinos in China (Mainland).
: , there were 9 Filipinos in Cuba.
: , there were at least 8,000 Filipinos in Denmark.
: , there were 5,717 Filipinos in Egypt.
: As of 2017, a total of about 300 Asian women (from the Philippines and Thailand) are living in the Faroe Islands, married to local men (no numbers given of how many women from each of the two Asian countries).
: As of 2019, there are 5,594 people in Finland born in the Philippines.
: , there were 44,967 Filipinos in France.
: , there were 65,000 Filipinos in Germany.
: , there were 61,681 Filipinos in Greece. See Filipinos in Greece
: , there were 220 Filipinos in Honduras.
: As of 2016 Census, there were 186,869 Filipinos in Hong Kong.
: , there were 2,000 Filipinos in Iceland.
: , there were about 2,000 Filipinos in India.
: , there were 4,800 Filipinos in Indonesia.
: , there were 903 Filipinos in Iran.
: , there were 1,640 Filipinos in Iraq.
: , there were 13,973 Filipinos in Ireland.
: , there were 29,473 Filipinos in Israel.
: , there were 168,238 documented Filipinos living in Italy. See Filipinos in Italy.
:  the Philippine government confirmed there were 325,000 Filipinos in Japan. See Filipinos in Japan.
: , there were 40,538 Filipinos in Jordan.
: , there were 7,000 Filipinos in Kazakhstan.
: , there were 241,999 Filipinos in Kuwait.
: , there were 33,424 Filipinos in Lebanon.
: , there were 2,300 Filipinos in Libya.

: , there were 30,000 Filipinos in Macau.
: , there were 620,043 Filipinos in Malaysia. See Filipinos in Malaysia
: , there were 3000 Filipinos in the Maldives. 
: , there were 1,200 Filipinos in Mexico.
: , there were 3,000 Filipinos in Morocco.
: There are approximately 300 Filipinos in Nepal.
: , there were 41,146 Filipinos in New Zealand.
: , there were 16,719 Filipinos in the Netherlands.
: See Filipinos in Nigeria 
: , there are 6 Filipinos in North Korea.
: , there were about 18,000 Filipinos in Norway, most of them living in the Oslo urban area. In addition to Filipinos who have intermarried with Norwegians, there are at least 900 licensed Filipino nurses, over a hundred oil engineers employed mostly in offshore projects in the western coast of Norway and Filipinos or Norwegians of Filipino descent working in the government sector, diplomatic missions and NGO's and commercial establishments.
: , there were 52,760 Filipinos in Oman. See Filipinos in Oman
: See Filipinos in Pakistan.
: , there were 4,000–7,000 Filipinos in Palau.
: , there were 411 Filipinos in Palestine.
: , there were 25,000 Filipinos in Papua New Guinea.
: , there were 525 Filipinos in Poland.
: , there were 3,200 to 20,000 Filipinos in Portugal.
: , there were 91,620 Filipinos in Puerto Rico.
: , there were 241,109 Filipinos in Qatar.
: As of 2017, the Philippine Embassy in Moscow counted "around 6,000" Filipinos in Russia. The Philippine Overseas Employment Administration (POEA)'s count rose to "close to 10,000" during the 2022 outbreak of the Russo-Ukrainian War. Given a bilateral labor-agreement in the works (as of 2021), that number is likely to increase, the effects of the war prove affect it enough.

: , there were 865,121 Filipinos in Saudi Arabia.
:  there are 76 Filipinos living in Serbia.
: , there were 200,000 Filipinos in Singapore.
: , there were 2,200 Filipinos in South Africa.
: , there were 52,379 Filipinos in South Korea.
: There are about 200,000 Filipino nationals in Spain. In addition, thousands more hold dual citizenship. Being formerly ruled by Spain, Filipino citizens can apply for dual citizenship within two years residence.
: , there were 24,456 Filipinos in Sweden.
: See Filipinos in Switzerland.
: , there were 147,000 Filipinos in Taiwan.
: See Filipinos in Thailand.
: , there were 5,500 Filipinos in Turkey.
: , there were about 600 Filipinos in Uganda.
: , there were 342 Filipinos in Ukraine.
: , there were 648,929 Filipinos in the United Arab Emirates.
: , there were 200,000 Filipinos in the United Kingdom. Nurses and caregivers have begun migrating to the United Kingdom in recent years. The island nation has welcomed thousands of nurses and various other occupations from the Philippines during the past 5 years. Many Filipino seamen settled in British port cities during the late 19th and early 20th centuries. Liverpool even had an area nicknamed 'Little Manila'. See Filipinos in the United Kingdom.
: , there were 3.4 million Filipinos in the United States, including those of partial descent. Despite race relation problems of the late 19th and early 20th centuries in the American Northwest, most Filipino Americans today find it easy to integrate into American society. Filipinos are the second-largest Asian American group in the country. The United States hosts the largest population of Filipinos outside the Philippines, with a Historic Filipinotown in Los Angeles designated in August 2002, the first district established outside the Philippines to honor and recognize the area's Filipino community. The largest population of Filipino Americans reside in California; there are other large populations in the New York metropolitan area, and Hawaii.
: , there were about 200 Filipinos living in Venezuela.
: , there were 150 Filipinos in Yemen.

See also
Balikbayan box
Filipinos in the New York metropolitan area
Human migration
Overseas Filipino Worker

References

Further reading

External links

General statistics from Philippine government
 POEA2004   (overseas Filipinos working and/or living overseas):
 3,187,586 stay permanently, 3,599,257 stay for work contracts, and 1,296,972 stay irregularly (without proper documents), which make a sum of 8,083,815.
 Press release on the 2004 Survey on Overseas Filipinos, Philippine Statistics Authority, on OFWs:
 1.06 million Overseas Filipino Workers
 33.4% are unskilled workers, 15.4% are Trades and related workers, 15.1% are plant and machine operators and assemblers.
 49.3% are males, 50.7% are females.
 Remittances are 64.7 billion Philippine pesos (equaled US$1.2 billion then)
 Deployed Landbased Overseas Filipino Workers by Destination (New hires and Rehires) (MS Excel format), Philippine Overseas Employment Administration, 2005, on OFWs:
 733,970 are landbased, 247,707 are seabased, which make a sum of 981,677. There is a 5.15% growth since 2004's 933,588.
 Remittances are US$9,727,138,000. There is a 26.6% growth since 2004.
 List of Additional Reports from the Philippine Overseas Employment Administration Statistics Page

From other sources

AUS - .
GWM - .
LBN - .
NZL - .
SAU - .
TWN - Alien Workers in Taiwan-Fukien Area by Industry and Nationality (JPG and PDF format), 2006 February, CLA, Taiwan.
MAL - .
USA
.

ARE – 
AUS – 
CAN – 
GWM – 
IRL – 
ITA – 
JPN – 
LBN – 
NZL – 
ROK – 
SAU – 
TWN – Alien Workers in Taiwan-Fukien Area by Industry and Nationality (JPG and PDF format), 2006 February, CLA, Taiwan.
USA

Overseas Filipino

Economy of the Philippines